Rewati Chetri (born 4 July 1993) is an Indian model and beauty pageant titleholder. She participated in Femina Miss India 2015 where she was a finalist. She has been crowned Miss Asia at the World Miss University 2016 pageant, held in Beijing. In 2016 she participated in the Senorita India pageant, and won the title of Miss International India 2016. She represented India at Miss International 2016 held in Tokyo, Japan

Awarded influencer model of the year 2021 by the India Fashion Awards

Early life
She was born to Baburam Chetri, an ASEB employee and Mrs. Bina Chetri, a homemaker at Haflong, the lone hill station of the state to a family in Dima Hasao district of Assam. She graduated from Lumding College, Lumding, and is now studying for a LL.B. at NEF Law College, which is affiliated to Gauhati University in Guwahati.

Acting career
In 2016, Chetri debuted as an actor in a music video produced by Dream House Production, for the Suresh Shama album Tumi Mur, with music was composed by "Bulbul and Rosty" and songs directed by Deepak Dey.

In 2017, Chetri appeared in the film Gangs Of North East.

She made her television debut in 2017 with an episodic of Pyaar Tune Kya Kiya (TV series) on Zing.

Social works

Chetri took part in a candlelight march with more than 200 people including many celebrities in May 2016 demanding justice to a brutally assaulted rape victim who was found dead near the Dihing river in Guwahati, Assam. This incident left entire state of Assam in shock and was compared to the Nirbhaya's incident of New Delhi. Rewati even pledged to support the victim's family.

Pageantry

Chetri participated in the first edition of Senorita India and she won the title of Miss International India. She represented India at Miss International 2016 pageant She won the title of Miss Asia (Best in Asia Continent) at the World Miss University pageant in 2016 held Beijing, China. Chetri was selected as a finalist in Miss Earth India 2016 and she withdrew herself from the competition due to her modeling contracts.

Femina Miss India 2015
Chetri made it to the Top - 5 as a Finalist of Miss India Kolkata, East India Audition of Miss India and qualified for Miss Femina Miss  India 2015 Top 21 Finalist. She was a Top 10 Finalist in Femina Miss India 2015, but couldn't advance further in competition. She also won the subtitles "Miss Popular" and "Miss Multimedia" in the same pageant.

Miss International 2016
She represented India at the 56th edition of Miss International pageant, which was held in Tokyo, Japan in October 2016.

Filmography

Films

Television

See also
Priyadarshini Chatterjee - Miss World India 2016.
Roshmitha Harimurthy - Miss Universe India 2016.
Brahmaputra Valley Film Festival

References

External links
 
 "Rewati Chetri the new face at Lakme Fashion Week 2018” https://www.hindustantimes.com/fashion-and-trends/six-hot-new-models-to-watch-out-at-lakme-fashion-week/story-CskpucQrbk9Uxhb2IaxyfI.html

1993 births
Living people
People from Dima Hasao district
People from Guwahati
Indian Gorkhas
Female models from Assam
Actresses from Assam
Indian television actresses
Beauty pageant contestants from India
Indian beauty pageant winners
Miss International 2016 delegates
Indian film actresses
Actresses in Hindi cinema
Actresses in Nepali cinema
Indian expatriate actresses in Nepal
21st-century Indian actresses